The Long March 3B (Chang Zheng 3B), also known as the CZ-3B and LM-3B, is a Chinese orbital launch vehicle. Introduced in 1996, it is launched from Launch Area 2 and 3 at the Xichang Satellite Launch Center in Sichuan. A three-stage rocket with four strap-on liquid rocket boosters, it is currently the second most powerful member of the Long March rocket family after the Long March 5 and the heaviest of the Long March 3 rocket family, and is mainly used to place communications satellites into geosynchronous orbits.

An enhanced version, the Long March 3B/E or G2, was introduced in 2007 to increase the rocket's geostationary transfer orbit (GTO) cargo capacity and lift heavier geosynchronous orbit (GEO) communications satellites. The Long March 3B also served as the basis for the medium-capacity Long March 3C, which was first launched in 2008.

History 
The development of the Long March 3B began in 1986 to meet the needs of the international GEO communications satellite market. During its maiden flight, on 14 February 1996 carrying the Intelsat 708 satellite, the rocket suffered a guidance failure two seconds into the flight and destroyed a nearby town, killing at least six people, but outside estimates suggest that anywhere between 200 and 500 people might have been killed. However, the author of the report later ruled out large casualties, because evidence suggest that the crash site was evacuated before the launch.

The Long March 3B and 3B/E rockets conducted ten successful launches between 1997 and 2008.

In 1997, the Agila 2 satellite was forced to use onboard propellant to reach its correct orbit because of poor injection accuracy on the part of its Long March 3B launch vehicle. In 2009, a Long March 3B partially failed during launch due to a third stage anomaly, which resulted in the Palapa-D satellite reaching a lower orbit than planned. Nonetheless, the satellite was able to maneuver itself into the planned orbit. The Long March 3B and its variants remain in active use , having conducted a total of 26 consecutive successful launches, since 19 June 2017 until 9 March 2020.

In December 2013, a Long March 3B/E successfully lifted Chang'e 3, China's first Lunar lander and rover into the projected lunar-transfer orbit.

In April 2020, the third stage of the Long March 3B/E failed during a Palapa-N1 communications satellite mission; this was the first total failure of the Long March 3B/E.

Design and variants 
The Long March 3B is based on the Long March 3A as its core stage, with four liquid boosters strapped on the first stage.

Long March 3B/E 
Its maiden flight took place on 13 May 2007, when it successfully launched Nigeria's NigComSat-1, the first African geosynchronous communications satellite. In 2013, it successfully launched China's first lunar lander Chang'e 3 and lunar rover Yutu.

Since 2015, the Long March 3B and 3C can optionally accommodate a YZ-1 upper stage, which has been used to carry dual launches or BeiDou navigation satellites into medium Earth orbit (MEO).

Long March 3C 

A modified version of the Long March 3B, the Long March 3C, was developed in the mid-1990s to bridge the gap in payload capacity between the Long March 3B and 3A. Its maiden launch took place on 25 April 2008.

Launch statistics

List of launches

Flight mishaps and anomalies

Intelsat 708 launch failure 

On 14 February 1996, the launch of the first Long March 3B with Intelsat 708 failed just after liftoff when the launch vehicle veered off course and exploded when it hit the ground at T+23 seconds.

The Xinhua news agency reported that six people were killed and 57 injured. However, the Americans on hand for the launch have testified that "dozens, if not hundreds", of people were seen to gather outside the centre's main gate near the crash site the night before launch. When reporters were being taken away from the site, they found that most buildings had sustained serious damage or had been flattened completely. Other eyewitnesses were noted as having seen dozens of ambulances and many flatbed trucks, loaded with what could have been human remains, being taken to the local hospital.

The cause of the accident was traced to short-circuiting of the vehicle's guidance platform at liftoff.

The participation of Space Systems/Loral in the accident investigation caused great political controversy in the United States. In 1997, the U.S. Defense Technology Security Administration found that China had obtained "significant benefit" from the Review Committee, results of which would improve their "launch vehicles ... ballistic missiles and in particular their guidance systems". 

As a result, the U.S. Congress reclassified satellite technology as a munition and placed it back under the restrictive International Traffic in Arms Regulations in 1998. No license to launch United States spacecraft on Chinese rockets has been approved by the U.S. State Department since then, and an official at the Bureau of Industry and Security emphasized in 2016 that "no U.S.-origin content, regardless of significance, regardless of whether it's incorporated into a foreign-made item, can go to China".

Palapa-D partial launch failure 
On 31 August 2009, during the launch of Palapa-D, the third stage engine under-performed and placed the satellite into a lower than planned orbit. The satellite was able to make up the performance shortfall using its own engine and reach geosynchronous orbit, but with its lifetime shortened to 10.5 years from the originally projected 15–16 years. The investigation found that the failure was due to burn-through of the engine's gas generator, and that "the most likely cause of the burn-through was a foreign matter or humidity-caused icing in the engine's liquid-hydrogen injectors".

ChinaSat-9A partial launch failure 
On 19 June 2017, a Long March 3B/E mission carrying ChinaSat-9A ended in partial failure. Officials did not release details regarding the status of the mission for at least 4 hours after liftoff. Two weeks later, on 7 July 2017, officials confirmed that the mission had been anomalous, with Space Daily reporting that "an anomaly was found on the carrier rocket's rolling control thruster, part of the attitude control engine, during the third gliding phase". The failure in the rocket's third stage left the payload in a lower than intended orbit, and the payload was forced to spend two weeks reaching its intended orbit under its own power.

Palapa-N1 (Nusantara Dua) launch failure 
On 9 April 2020, a Long March 3B launcher failed after lifting off from the Xichang Satellite Launch Center in the southwestern Sichuan province at 11:46 UTC during the launch of an Indonesian communications satellite, Palapa-N1 (Nusantara Dua) of a mass of 5500 kg and was expected to enter service in geostationary orbit at 113.0° East, replacing the Palapa-D satellite. But one of the two YF-75 third stage engines failed to ignite, preventing the Palapa-N1 (Nusantara Dua) satellite from reaching orbit. Wreckage from the third stage and the Palapa-N1 spacecraft re-entered the atmosphere, leading to sightings of fiery debris in the skies over Guam. With the Long March 3B failure, Chinese rockets have faltered on two missions in less than a month. A Long March 7A rocket failed to place a satellite in orbit on 16 March 2020 after taking off from the Wenchang Spacecraft Launch Site on Hainan Island, located in southern China. After two Chinese launch failures in less than a month, further Chinese launches will be likely delayed until it is sure that the quality control is satisfactory.

Controversy regarding booster jettisoning 
There have been many confirmed reports and videos of boosters that have been jettisoned and landed in small villages in China. These boosters being hypergolic and highly toxic, there has been large amounts of controversy regarding photos taken of the staged boosters on fire and with civilians standing nearby. These photos ultimately led to questioning of the ethical aspect of the China National Space Administration (CNSA). Debris from the Long March 3B rocket ends up crashing into villages because unlike launchpads for other space agencies which are usually by the coastline, China's main launch pads are inland. Jettisoning rocket boosters to follow a trajectory into the ocean from an inland launch pad is a very hard process as most satellite-carrying rockets follow an almost vertical trajectory until it reaches an apoapsis slightly higher than the Earth's higher atmosphere.

Notable payloads 
 Beidou
 Chang'e 3
 Chang'e 4
 Eutelsat W3C
 TJS-5
 Apstar 6C
 Chinasat 9A
 Chinasat 6C
 Palapa-D
 Fengyun 4B
 NigComSat-1
 Tiantong 1-03
 Gaofen 14

References

External links 
 LM-3B User's Manual at GlobalSecurity.org
 Long March-3B (LM-3B) at the China Academy of Launch Vehicle Technology

Long March (rocket family)
Vehicles introduced in 1996